Wiesengraben is a river of North Rhine-Westphalia, Germany, near Halle (Westfalen). It is the right headstream of the Ruthebach.

See also
List of rivers of North Rhine-Westphalia

References

Rivers of North Rhine-Westphalia
Rivers of Germany